San Dionisio Ocotepec  is a town and municipality in Oaxaca in south-western Mexico. The municipality covers an area of 225.82 km². 
It is part of the Tlacolula District in the east of the Valles Centrales Region.

As of 2005, the municipality had a total population of 9487.

References

Municipalities of Oaxaca